Isaiah Greenhouse (born July 15, 1987) is a former American football linebacker and fullback. He was signed by the Houston Texans as an undrafted free agent in 2010. He played college football at Northwestern State.

Professional career

Houston Texans
After going undrafted in the 2010 NFL Draft, Greenhouse was signed by the Houston Texans on May 18, 2010. They tried him at fullback, but moved him back to linebacker later. He was cut on September 3, 2010, and signed to the practice squad two days later. He was called up from the practice squad on October 3, 2010, but was waived on October 10, after being on the roster for one week. He was re-signed to the practice squad on November 3, 2010. Greenhouse was promoted on December 29, 2010. He was re-signed on January 5, 2011. The Texans released him on February 18, 2011.

Dallas Cowboys
Greenhouse was signed by the Dallas Cowboys on March 1, 2011.

On August 16, 2011, he was moved to fullback. He was waived on September 3, 2011, and was signed to the practice squad the next day. He was waived/injured on August 23, 2012.

References

External links
Houston Texans bio

1987 births
Living people
American football linebackers
Northwestern State Demons football players
Houston Texans players
Dallas Cowboys players
People from Marksville, Louisiana
Marksville High School alumni